The Organics Recycling Group (ORG), formerly the Association for Organics Recycling (AfOR) and before that the Composting Association, is the leading trade organisation for the biodegradable waste management industry in the UK. It helped to develop the BSI PAS 100 industry standard for composts.

ORG was formed by the merger of AfOR and the Renewable Energy Association (REA) on 1 January 2013 which created a membership of around 1,100 companies, organisations and individuals.

To main objective of the group is to promote the sustainable management of biodegradable resources, covering both aerobic and anaerobic technologies such as windrow and in-vessel composting, anaerobic digestion and mechanical biological treatment. ORG specialises in issues covering the collection, treatment and use of these resources, to complement the work undertaken by the REA on matters such as distributed generation, financial incentives, the Renewables Obligation and planning.

See also
Anaerobic digestion
BSI PAS 100
Compost
Composting

References

External links
Organics Recycling Group website

Bioenergy in the United Kingdom
Composting
Professional associations based in the United Kingdom
Waste organizations